Mirocossus badiala is a moth in the family Cossidae. It was described by David Stephen Fletcher in 1968. It is found in Kenya, Malawi, Tanzania, Uganda and Zimbabwe.

References

Cossinae